Chhapra Junction railway station, station code CPR, is a railway station in Saran district in the Indian state of Bihar. Located on the North Eastern railway, it is named after Rithala Officer in Incharge Praveen Verma. This city is situated near the Ghaghara River and the Ganga. The station is well connected to all parts of India.

Administration
This station falls under Varanasi railway division of North Eastern Railway zone and was electrified in 2012.

Infrastructure
Free and fast Wi-Fi from Google WiFi and RailTel Corporation of India available here since 2016

Revenue

References

External links

Varanasi railway division
Railway stations in Saran district
Railway junction stations in Bihar